The Dunstan River is a  river in the town of Scarborough in Cumberland County, Maine, USA. Its lower portion flows through salt marshes and it is a tributary of the tidal Scarborough River.

See also
List of rivers of Maine

References

Maine Streamflow Data from the USGS
Maine Watershed Data From Environmental Protection Agency

Rivers of Maine